Lakeside Church is an evangelical, nondenominational church, in Guelph, close to Toronto, Canada. The church is located near Guelph Lake, north of the Guelph city limits.

History of Lakeside
Lakeside Church was founded by David Booker, along with forty families, in 1989. The church conducted its first service on 24 October that year. Booker retired as Pastor in 1998 and was succeeded the following year by David Ralph, who remained as Lead Pastor until 2017. A 1,000-seat auditorium was built in 2007. In 2014, the church opened its second campus at Lakeside Downtown and held its first downtown service on Jan. 5 (the downtown location was closed in 2022). Today, Marc Gagnon serves as Lakeside's Lead Pastor.

Outreach and charitable work
Lakeside Church started Lakeside HOPE House, (now Hope House Guelph) which opened its doors on Sept. 8, 2012. HOPE is an acronym for Helping Overcome Poverty Everywhere.  From the premises of the Lakeside Downtown campus, it operates a food bank, a gymnasium, a café, two kitchens, offices, classrooms, and a 400-seat auditorium.

Lakeside Church has ministries targeted towards children, students, and young adults, and also runs recovery programs to assist people suffering from grief, divorce, and drug addiction.

Lakeside Church has an extensive missionary program and is involved in ministries in Africa, Central America, and Haiti. The church is partnering with PACE Africa to build Lakeside High School in Nyahururu, Kenya.

Church relationships and leadership
Lakeside has no official denominational affiliations, but it networks with other Evangelical churches of various denominations.

Lakeside holds one service on Sunday at 10am.

The church is governed by a board of elders. Marc Gagnon is the Lead Pastor.

Notable people associated with Lakeside Church
Lakeside Church partner Cam Guthrie has served as mayor of Guelph since 2014.

References

Churches in Ontario
Open Brethren churches in Canada